Agrocybe viscosa is a species of agaric fungus in the family Strophariaceae. Found in Chile, it was described as new to science by mycologist Rolf Singer in 1969.

References

External links

Fungi described in 1969
Fungi of Chile
Strophariaceae
Taxa named by Rolf Singer